Foxhunt is the debut ep by Australian music collective Dukes of Windsor, released on 15 August 2005.

Track listing

Release history

References

Dukes of Windsor albums
2005 EPs